Malik Sultan Mehmood Hanjra (born 1 January 1948) is a Pakistani politician who had been a member of the National Assembly of Pakistan, from June 2013 to May 2018.

Early life
He was born on 1 January 1948.

Political career

He was elected to the National Assembly of Pakistan as a candidate of Pakistan Muslim League (N) (PML-N) from Constituency NA-176 (Muzaffargarh-I) in 2013 Pakistani general election. He received 88,322 votes and defeated Ghulam Mustafa Khar..

In 2014, he was disqualified by the Election tribunal Bahawalpur to be a member of the National Assembly. Following which the Supreme Court of Pakistan suspended the notification of Hanjra's disqualification. In 2016, his National Assembly membership was restored.

References

Living people
Pakistan Muslim League (N) politicians
Punjabi people
Pakistani MNAs 2013–2018
1948 births
People from Muzaffargarh
People from Muzaffargarh District
Politicians from Muzaffargarh